Dayton–Wright Brothers Airport  is a public airport located 10 miles (16 km) south of the central business district of Dayton, Ohio, located mainly in Miami Township, Montgomery County and partly in Clearcreek Township, Warren County, near the suburb of Springboro. It is owned and operated by the City of Dayton and serves as the reliever airport for Dayton International Airport. It mainly serves corporate and personal aircraft users. The airport's identifying code, MGY, is a reference to its former name of Montgomery County Airport.

Facilities and aircraft 
The airport has instrument landing facilities, but does not have a control tower.

For the 12-month period ending September 2, 2016, the airport had 89,045 aircraft operations, an average of 244 per day: 93% general aviation (48% general aviation local, 45% general aviation itinerant), 7% air taxi and <1% military. There are 67 aircraft based at this airport: 73% single engine, 15% multi-engine, 3% helicopter and 9% jet.

The airport facilities also include a runway equipped with a partial precision approach consisting of a localizer (LOC), approach lighting system (MALS), runway lighting (MIRL) and a visual approach slope indicator (VASI), 68 T-hangars, 6 conventional hangars, . maintenance facility and   administration building.

Historic replicas
On the airport grounds is a replica of the Wright brothers' Huffman Prairie hangar, containing a museum and replica Wright B Flyer. The museum is open to the public during limited hours.

References

External links 
Dayton–Wright Brothers Airport 
Wright "B" Flyer hangar at Dayton–Wright Brothers Airport 

Airports in Ohio
Buildings and structures in Montgomery County, Ohio
Transportation in Dayton, Ohio